Ardee (also known as Ardee Borough) was a constituency represented in the Irish House of Commons from 1378 to 1801.

History
Ardee in County Louth was enfranchised as a borough constituency in 1378. In 1665 the Lord Lieutenant (James Butler, 1st Duke of Ormonde) wrote to the Portreeve of Ardee recommending Sir Robert Byron, as Burgess in Parliament for Ardee, in the room of Captain John Chambers, "removed" and Colonel Brent Moore, in the "stead of Lieutenant John Ruxton, removed". In the Patriot Parliament of 1689 summoned by King James II, Ardee was represented by two members. It continued to send two Members of Parliament to the Irish House of Commons until the Parliament of Ireland was merged into the Parliament of the United Kingdom on 1 January 1801. The constituency was disenfranchised on 31 December 1800.

The borough was represented in the House of Commons of the United Kingdom as part of the county constituency of Louth.

Electoral system and electorate
The parliamentary representatives of the borough were elected using the bloc vote for two-member elections and first past the post for single-member by-elections.

A summary of the borough electorate was included in Lewis's Topographical Dictionary of Ireland, 1837. The electorate consisted of the members of the Borough Corporation (the local Council) and the freemen. All of the classes of electors qualified because of co-option by all or part of the existing ones, so this was a constituency with an oligarchic constitution rather than a democratic one.

Members of Parliament
 1559–1559: Walter Dowdall and Walter Babe
 1585–1586: John Dowdall and Robert Barnewall
 1613–1615: Patrick Dowdall and Barnabas Matthew
 1634–1635: John Dowdall and Thomas Kippaks (Cappock)
 1639–1643: Henry Moore (succeeded to peerage 1643 and replaced by Raphael Hunt)
 1661–1665: John Ruxton (expelled and replaced 1665 by Erasmus Smith) and John Chambers (expelled and replaced by Sir Richard Stephens)
 1665–1666: Erasmus Smith and Sir Richard Stephens

1689–1801

Notes

References

Bibliography

Constituencies of the Parliament of Ireland (pre-1801)
Historic constituencies in County Louth
1378 establishments in Ireland
Constituencies established in 1378
1800 disestablishments in Ireland
Constituencies disestablished in 1800
Ardee